Annapoorna Kini is an American cardiologist. She is Professor of Cardiology and Interventional Director of Structural Heart Program at Mount Sinai School of Medicine in New York City.

Education
Kini completed her pre-university education from Vivekananda College, Puttur (D.K. District, Karnataka) in 1984. She received her MBBS from the Kasturba Medical College, Mangalore in 1991, completing residencies at the University of Wales College of Medicine (in 1996). After receiving training in England, she became a member of the Royal College of Physicians of London.  She completed three fellowships at Mount Sinai Medical Center – in 1997, 2001, and 2002, respectively.

Career
Kini serves as a Professor of Medicine, Director of Cardiac Catheterization Laboratory, Director of Interventional Structural Heart Disease Program, and Director of Interventional Cardiology Fellowship at The Mount Sinai Medical Center, where she was named Zena and Michael A. Wiener Medicine Professor in 2016. She researches on the field of percutaneous coronary intervention and heart valve therapy.

Kini co-established, with Samin Sharma the Live Symposium of Complex Coronary and Vascular Cases in 1998 and has served as Director of the Annual Live Symposium of Complex Coronary & Vascular Cases at The Mount Sinai Medical Center.

Awards 
Kini was awarded the 2011 Dean's Award for Excellence in Clinical Medicine by The Mount Sinai Health System. In 2017 she was given the Ellis Island Medal of Honor to congratulate her on achievements as an Indian immigrant in the US. She was the 2018 recipient of the Heart of Gold award from the American Heart Association and in 2019 Kini was honored by the New York chapter of the Association of Indians in America for her successful career in cardiology.

Publications 
Kini  has co-written and had published more than 100 peer-reviewed scientific publications, as well as book chapters in cardiology textbooks.

Books 
She is co-author of Atlas of Coronary Intravascular Optical Coherence Tomography, Practical Manual of Interventional Cardiology, Percutaneous Interventions in Women, An Issue of Interventional Cardiology Clinics, Advanced Applied Interventional Cardiology, An Issue of Cardiology Clinics, Cardiovascular Intensive Care, An Issue of Cardiology Clinics, Coronary artherectomy: Contemporary concepts in cardiology and (with Dr. Valentín Fuster) of Definitions of acute coronary syndromes in Hurst's The Heart.

Mobile applications 

Kini designed and implemented a mobile app for treatment of patients with a ST-segment elevation myocardial infarction, STEMI, medical emergency requiring immediate attention and treatment, STEMIcathAID. The app optimizes provides a communication platform for multiple teams taking care of a STEMI patients in order to reduce treatment delays and improve patient outcomes. In addition, she created a suite of educational mobile and web applications covering different aspects of interventional cardiology such as bifurcation intervention, treatment of calcified lesion, optical coherence tomography imaging, coronary angiography and PCI in patients after TAVR, management of procedural complications and selection of appropriate coronary guidewires.

Peer-reviewed articles 
Partial list:

References

External links 
Ellis Island Medalist Spotlight: Dr. Annapoorna Kini, MD
TCT 2018: Dr. C. Michael Gibson talks with Dr. Annapoorna Kini: Clinician, researcher, educator, app developer - an inspiration for women
CCC Live Cases webcast

Indian emigrants to the United States
Alumni of the University of Wales
American cardiologists
American medical academics
Living people
Mangaloreans
Icahn School of Medicine at Mount Sinai faculty
American people of Kannada descent
Manipal Academy of Higher Education alumni
American women of Indian descent in health professions
Year of birth missing (living people)